Doris Keane (December 12, 1881 – November 25, 1945) was an American actress, primarily in live theatre.

Early life and family
Keane was born in Michigan to Joseph Keane and Florence Winter. She was educated privately in Chicago, New York, Paris, and Rome and at the American Academy of Dramatic Arts.

Career
Her first professional role was in Whitewashing Julia in 1903. This was a small role, but she went on to play leading roles in The Happy Marriage in 1909 and The Lights o' London in 1911. 

In 1913, she played Margherita Cavallini in Edward Sheldon's Romance. Her leading man in this long-running play was William Courtenay, who played the part of a priest. Sheldon originally had offered the male lead to his friend John Barrymore, but Barrymore turned it down, preferring to still do comedies. Sheldon reportedly fell in love with her and yearned for her all his life. She played this part in the United States and Europe for the next five years and returned in revivals regularly during the 1920s. 

In 1918 at the Lyric Theatre, London she was the star of 'Roxana', a comedy by Avery Hopwood. She played the role of Roxana Clayton opposite Basil Sydney.

In 1920, she made a silent film of Romance distributed by the then newly formed United Artists. Her male lead in the film was Basil Sydney. She played Catherine the Great in Czarina in 1922 after Sheldon had revised the play especially for her.

Personal life 

She married Basil Sydney, 13 years her junior, in 1918; they divorced in 1925. She had one child, Ronda Keane (1915–2008), born in Cannes, France in 1915. Ronda's father was the financier Howard Gould. He acknowledged his paternity but never married Doris. Ronda married Dr , a New York-based thoracic specialist, in 1951.

Doris Keane was an avid reader, leaving behind an extensive library, including The Upanishads.  She was a favorite subject for artists of the day, among them the sculptor Jacob Epstein and the portraitist De Laszlo. There are at least two Royal Doulton figurines of her, one holding the monkey that was part of the play Romance.

Death
On November 25, 1945, Keane died of cancer in New York City at the LeRoy Sanitarium.

References

External links

 
 
 Doris Keane photo at NYP Library
 Doris Keane portrait at the Univ of Louisville, Macauley's Theatre collection
 Doris Keane and Jacob Ben-Ami in 1924 Edward Steichen portrait
 Broadway Photographs(Univ. of South Carolina)

1881 births
1945 deaths
People from St. Joseph, Michigan
American silent film actresses
American stage actresses
Deaths from cancer in New York (state)
20th-century American actresses